Williamstown is a home-rule-class city in Grant and Pendleton counties in the U.S. state of Kentucky. The population was 3,925 at the 2010 census, up from 3,227 as of the 2000 census. It is the county seat of Grant County.

History
When Grant County was formed in 1820, William Arnold offered land for the county seat. Arnold was a veteran of the Revolutionary War and settled in the area in 1795. The town built there was named after him when it incorporated in 1825.

The county grew slowly, reaching a population of just 281 by 1870. The Cincinnati Southern Railway was built through the county in 1877, and Williamstown Lake was created in 1957. Finally, Interstate 75 was built in the 1960s.

Since 2016, Williamstown is home to Ark Encounter theme park with its newly built Noah's Ark.

Geography
Williamstown is located east of the center of Grant County at  (38.641184, -84.560920). It is bordered to the north by the city of Dry Ridge. The city limits extend northeast  along Falmouth Road and East Fairview Road to slightly enter Pendleton County. Interstate 75 passes through the west side of the city, with access from Exits 154 and 156. I-75 leads north  to Cincinnati and south  to Lexington. U.S. Route 25 passes through the center of Williamstown as Main Street; US 25 leads north  to Crittenden and south the same distance to Corinth.

Williamstown Lake, a reservoir on the South Fork of Grassy Creek, is in the northeast part of the city.

Climate
The climate in this area is characterized by hot, humid summers and generally mild to cool winters.  According to the Köppen Climate Classification system, Williamstown has a humid subtropical climate, abbreviated "Cfa" on climate maps.

Demographics

As of the census of 2010, there were 3,925 people, 1,279 households, and 879 families residing in the city. The racial makeup of the city was 95.72% White, 1.78% African American, 0.25% Native American, 0.18% Asian, 0.36% Pacific Islander, 0.99% from other races, and 0.71% from two or more races. Hispanic or Latino of any race were 1.46% of the population.

There were 1,279 households, out of which 32.0% had children under the age of 18 living with them, 52.3% were married couples living together, 13.1% had a female householder with no husband present, and 31.2% were non-families. 28.4% of all households were made up of individuals, and 15.9% had someone living alone who was 65 years of age or older. The average household size was 2.45 and the average family size was 2.98.

In the city, the population was spread out, with 25.8% under the age of 18, 8.5% from 18 to 24, 28.6% from 25 to 44, 20.4% from 45 to 64, and 16.6% who were 65 years of age or older. The median age was 35 years. For every 100 females, there were 85.5 males. For every 100 females age 18 and over, there were 82.3 males.

The median income for a household in the city was $33,750, and the median income for a family was $44,808. Males had a median income of $31,466 versus $21,492 for females. The per capita income for the city was $17,945. About 10.9% of families and 15.4% of the population were below the poverty line, including 16.1% of those under age 18 and 20.1% of those age 65 or over.

Education
Williamstown has a lending library, the Grant County Public Library.

Economy
Ark Encounter is a Christian theme park with a full-scale interpretation of Noah's Ark, operated by Answers in Genesis.

Notable people
 Julius Freiberg, brewer
 Rodney McMullen, CEO of Kroger
 Arnie Risen, basketball player, member of the Basketball Hall of Fame
 Doc Sechrist, baseball player
 Harry Westover, United States federal judge

References

External links
 City of Williamstown official website
 Historical Texts and Images of Williamstown

Cities in Grant County, Kentucky
Cities in Pendleton County, Kentucky
Cities in Kentucky
County seats in Kentucky